Alving is a surname that can refer to:

Barbro Alving (1909 – 1987), Swedish journalist writer, pacifist and feminist
Fanny Alving, writer
Helen and Captain Alving, characters in Henrik Ibsen's play Ghosts

See also
Alvingham
Alvington (disambiguation)